Snatched may refer to:

 Snatched (1973 film), an American made-for-television crime film starring Howard Duff and John Saxon
 Snatched (2017 film), an American comedy film starring Goldie Hawn and Amy Schumer

See also
 Snatch (disambiguation)
 Snatcher (disambiguation)